Kashil is a village in Satara District of Maharashtra state in Western India. It lies at the confluence of the Krishna River and the Urmodi River.

How to reach Kashil
By Road - Kashil lies on NH4 highway
MSRTC runs bus service from Satara and Karad. Kashil is exactly 26 km from both Satara and Karad.

Nearby Cities
Umbraj - 10 km
Nagthane - 10 km
Satara - 26 km
Karad - 26 km
Sangli - 95 km
Kolhapur - 100 km
Pune - 139 km

Nearby villages 
Towards satara - Atit, Nagthane, Majgaon, Borgaon, Bharatgaon, Valase, Shendre, Satara
Towards Karad - Perle, Indoli, Umbraj, Varhade, Tasawade, Wahagaon, Khodashi, Belawade, Karad
On East - Nisrale, khodad, Koparde, Venegaon, Tukaiwadi, Sayli
On West - Pali, Marli, Chore, Tarle

Education in Kashil
There is a High School in Kashil named "Yashwant High School, Kashil". This school is run by Rayat Shikshan Sanstha which was established by Karmaveer Bhaurao Patil. This school have education up to 10th standard. For further education students choose Satara, Karad, Umbraj or Nagthane.
There are also four Primary Schools run by Satara ZP.

Villages in Satara district